This is list of members of the Argentine Senate from 10 December 2007 to 9 December 2009.

Composition
as of 9 December 2009

Senate leadership

Election cycles

List of senators

Notes

References

External links
List on the official website (archived) 

2007-2009
2007 in Argentina
2008 in Argentina
2009 in Argentina